Jefrem (Ephraem; c. 1312 – died 1400), also known as Elder Jefrem (старац Јефрем) and Jefrem of Serbia, was the Patriarch of the Serbian Orthodox Church twice, in 1375–1379 and 1389–1392, and also a renowned poet.

Biography
Born into a priestly family, of Bulgarian origin, he became a monk in c. 1335 at 23 years of age. He moved to Mount Athos, and stayed at Hilandar, and later at Zograf and as a hesychastic ascetic in the mountains of Athos. He left Athos in c. 1347 for a monastery on a river island of the Maritsa near Plovdiv where he became a hegumen. He then moved to Serbia, and stayed in the Patriarchal Monastery of Peć. He lived in a cave-church near Visoki Dečani. Patriarch Sava IV built an ascetic cell for him in Ždrelo near the Patriarchal Monastery of Peć. When unrest broke out in the state and Church, the Synod chose Jefrem to succeed as patriarch on 3 October 3, 1375. He managed to save the Church from interference from feudal lords by renouncing his throne and turning it over to Spiridon, and became an ascetic. Following the death of Spiridon in 1389, Jefrem again took office. However, he once again renounced the throne in 1392, and then retired to Ždrelo. He died in the evening of 14 June 1400, and was buried the next day at the Patriarchal Monastery of Peć. According to the hagiography of Jefrem, Sava V was present at the burial. Jefrem left a large original poetry work, preserved in a 14th-century manuscript from Hilandar.
 
In 1406 or 1407 ("seven summers after ascendance") he was proclaimed a saint by Sava V after showing signs of sainthood. Bishop Marko wrote the Service to St. Jefrem and Life of St. Jefrem. His feast day is celebrated on June 15/28, together with St. Lazar and St. Spyridon.

Annotations
Historiography treat him as being of Bulgarian origin. Another source claim that he was from Thessaly.

See also
 List of Serbian saints

References

Sources
Books

Journals

Patriarchs of the Serbian Orthodox Church
14th-century Serbian people
14th-century Bulgarian people
1322 births
1400 deaths
14th-century Eastern Orthodox bishops
Serbian monks
Serbian people of Bulgarian descent
Burials at the Patriarchate of Peć (monastery)
Serbian saints of the Eastern Orthodox Church
Hesychasts
People associated with Mount Athos
People associated with Hilandar Monastery
People associated with Zograf Monastery